Saviour King is the sixteenth album in the live praise and worship series of Christian Contemporary music by Hillsong Church. It debuted at No. 6 on the ARIA album chart on 9 July 2007, while the DVD debuted at No. 2 on the DVD chart. On the US Billboard Top Christian Albums Chart, it debuted at No. 5.

Making of the album 

Saviour King was recorded live at the Acer Arena on 18 March 2007 by Darlene Zschech and the Hillsong team after the annual Hillsong Colour Conference. After many years at the Sydney Entertainment Centre, Hillsong Church moved the annual live album recording to the Acer Arena. This was also the last official album to feature Steve McPherson as a vocalist. McPherson is still a part of Hillsong Church as a publisher. Also, this was the last album in which Zschech appeared as a worship pastor.

The front cover depicts Hillsong Church congregation and the Hillsong Live logo, while the inverse side depicts Darlene Zschech, Reuben Morgan, Joel Houston and Marty Sampson.

Writing and composition 

The album contains songs written and used in Hillsong Church from early 2006 to March 2007. Songs such as "I'm Not Ashamed" and "Here in My Life" were written earlier in 2006, while songs like "Lord of Lords", "In the Mystery" and "One Thing" were written around the time of the album recording. "Break Free", "Hosanna" and "Saviour King" were released on the Hillsong United album All of the Above.

The majority of songs were written by Marty Sampson, Reuben Morgan, Joel Houston, Brooke Fraser, Mia Fieldes and Ben Fielding. Matt Crocker from Hillsong United youth, who wrote songs on the Hillsong United EP In a Valley by the Sea, contributed to two songs.

Track listing (CD)

Track listing (DVD) 

 "Saviour King" [introduction] (Marty Sampson)
 "I'm Not Ashamed" (Marty Sampson)
 "Break Free" (Joel Houston)
 "Hosanna" (Brooke Fraser and Darlene Zschech)
 "Here in My Life" (Darlene Zschech)
 "You Are Faithful" (Darlene Zschech)
 "In Your Freedom" (Marty Sampson)
 "To Know Your Name" (Jad Gillies)
 "In the Mystery" (Joel Houston)
 "God of Ages" (Darlene Zschech and Reuben Morgan)
 "You Are My Strength" (Reuben Morgan)
 "One Thing" (Darlene Zschech)
 "Lord of Lords" (Brooke Fraser)
 "You Saw Me" (Reuben Morgan)
 "Saviour King" (Marty Sampson)

Personnel

 Darlene Zschech – worship pastor, executive producer, producer, senior worship leader, senior lead vocal
 Phil Dooley – creative director, executive producer
 Andrew Crawford – producer
 Joel Houston – producer, United worship leader, acoustic guitar
 Reuben Morgan – producer, worship leader, acoustic guitar, music director & arranger
 Marty Sampson – worship leader, acoustic guitar
 Jad Gillies – worship leader, acoustic guitar
 Brooke Fraser – worship leader, acoustic guitar
 Nigel Hendroff – electric guitar
 Ben Fielding - electric guitar
 Steve McPherson – other vocals
 Paul Andrew – other vocals
 Scott Bakken – other vocals
 Julie Bassett – other vocals
 Damian Bassett – other vocals
 Debbie-Ann Bax – other vocals
 Julie Cowdroy – other vocals
 Kathryn De Araujo – other vocals
 Jonathan Douglass (J.D) – other vocals
 Katie Elmore – other vocals
 Deborah Ezzy – other vocals
 Mia Fields – other vocals
 Karen Horn – other vocals
 Sam Knock – other vocals
 Kelista Puddle – other vocals
 Katie Restivo – other vocals
 Barry Southgate – other vocals
 Katrina Tadman – other vocals
 Marcus Temu – other vocals
 Aaron Watson – other vocals
 Holly Watson – other vocals
 Ryan Watts Thomas – other vocals
 Peter Kelly – percussion
 Jason Blackbourn – percussion
 Timon Klein – electric guitar
 Nigel Hendroff – electric guitar
 Raymond Badham – electric guitar 
 Dylan Thomas – electric guitar
 Matthew Tennikoff – bass guitar
 Gian Peipman – bass guitar
 Ntando Mpofu – bass guitar
 Ben Whincop – bass guitar
 Dane Charles – drums
 Rolf Wam Fjell – drums
 Simon Kobler – drums
 Paul Mabury – drums
 Peter James – keyboards
 Kevin Lee – keyboards 
 Peter King – keyboards 
 Autumn Hardman – keyboards 
 Hillsong Church Choir – choir

References

External links
Video Preview

2007 live albums
2007 video albums
Live video albums
Hillsong Music live albums
Hillsong Music video albums

pt:Saviour King